Tremella fuciformis is a species of fungus; it produces white, frond-like, gelatinous basidiocarps (fruiting bodies). It is widespread, especially in the tropics, where it can be found on the dead branches of broadleaf trees. This fungus is commercially cultivated and is one of the most popular fungi in the cuisine and medicine of China. Tremella fuciformis is commonly known as snow fungus, snow ear, silver ear fungus, white jelly mushroom, and white cloud ears.

Tremella fuciformis is a parasitic yeast, and grows as a slimy, mucus-like film until it encounters its preferred hosts, various species of Annulohypoxylon (or possibly Hypoxylon) fungi, whereupon it then invades, triggering the aggressive mycelial growth required to form the fruiting bodies.

Taxonomy and naming

Tremella fuciformis was first described in 1856 by English mycologist Miles Joseph Berkeley, based on collections made in Brazil by the botanist and explorer Richard Spruce.  In 1939, Japanese mycologist Yosio Kobayasi described Nakaiomyces nipponicus, a similar-looking fungus that differed by having scattered, dark spines on its surface. Later research, however, showed that the fruit bodies were those of Tremella fuciformis parasitized by an ascomycete, Ceratocystis epigloeum, that formed the dark spines. Nakaiomyces nipponicus is therefore a synonym of T. fuciformis.

In Mandarin Chinese, it is called 银耳 (pinyin: yín ěr; literally "silver ear"), 雪耳 (pinyin: xuě ěr; literally "snow ear"); or 白木耳 (pinyin: bái mù ěr, literally "white wood ear"), and in Japanese it is called shiro kikurage (シロキクラゲ, lit. "white tree jellyfish"). In Vietnam, it is called nấm tuyết or ngân nhĩ.

In his book, Growing Gourmet and Medicinal Mushrooms, Paul Stamets lists the following common names for Tremella fuciformis (which he calls "white jelly mushroom"): yin er, white jelly fungus, white jelly leaf ("shirokikurage"), silver ear mushroom, snow mushroom, chrysanthemum mushroom.

Description
Microscopically, the hyphae are clamped and occur in a dense gelatinous matrix. Haustorial cells arise on the hyphae, producing filaments that attach to and penetrate the hyphae of the host. The basidia are tremelloid (ellipsoid, with oblique to vertical septa), 10–13 μm × 6.5–10 μm, sometimes stalked. The basidiospores are ellipsoid, smooth, 5–8 μm × 4–6 μm, and germinate by hyphal tube or by yeast cells.

Habitat and distribution
Tremella fuciformis is known to be a parasite of Hypoxylon species. Many of these species were reassigned to a new genus, Annulohypoxylon, in 2005 including its preferred host, Annulohypoxylon archeri, the species routinely used in commercial cultivation. Following its host, fruit bodies are typically found on dead, attached or recently fallen branches of broadleaf trees.

The species is mainly tropical and subtropical, but extends into temperate areas in Asia and North America. It is known throughout South and Central America, the Caribbean, parts of North America, sub-Saharan Africa, southern and eastern Asia, Australia, New Zealand (although this may be an NZ indigenous species), and the Pacific Islands.

Economic usage

Tremella fuciformis has been cultivated in China since at least the nineteenth century. Initially, suitable wooden poles were prepared and then treated in various ways in the hope that they would be colonized by the fungus. This haphazard method of cultivation was improved when poles were inoculated with spores or mycelium. Modern production only began, however, with the realization that both the Tremella and its host species needed to be inoculated into the substrate to ensure success. The "dual culture" method, now used commercially, employs a sawdust mix inoculated with both fungal species and kept under optimal conditions. The most popular species to pair with T. fuciformis is its preferred host, Annulohypoxylon archeri. Estimated production in China in 1997 was 130,000 tonnes. Tremella fuciformis is also cultivated in other East Asian countries, with some limited cultivation elsewhere.

In Chinese cuisine, Tremella fuciformis is traditionally used in sweet dishes. While tasteless, it is valued for its gelatinous texture as well as its supposed medicinal benefits. Most commonly, it is used to make a dessert soup called luk mei in Cantonese, often in combination with jujubes, dried longans, and other ingredients. It is also used as a component of a drink and as an ice cream. Since cultivation has made it less expensive, it is now additionally used in some savoury dishes.
In Vietnamese cuisine, it's often used in Chè (Vietnamese pronunciation: [cɛ̂]), a Vietnamese term that refers to any traditional Vietnamese sweet beverage, dessert soup or pudding.

Cosmetic use
Tremella fuciformis extract is used in women's beauty products from China, Korea, and Japan. The fungus reportedly increases moisture retention in the skin and prevents senile degradation of micro-blood vessels in the skin, reducing wrinkles and smoothing fine lines. Other anti-aging effects come from increasing the presence of superoxide dismutase in the brain and liver; it is an enzyme that acts as a potent antioxidant throughout the body, particularly in the skin. Tremella fuciformis is also known in Chinese medicine for nourishing the lungs.

See also

Medicinal fungi
Wood ear, a fungus with similar uses in Chinese medicine and cuisine

References

External links

Tremellomycetes
Edible fungi
Fungi in cultivation
Fungi of Africa
Fungi of Asia
Fungi of Australia
Fungi of Central America
Fungi of New Zealand
Fungi of North America
Fungi of the Caribbean
Fungi of South America
Fungi described in 1856
Taxa named by Miles Joseph Berkeley